Re matto is the second studio EP by Italian singer Marco Mengoni. In Italy the album sold more than 82.000 copies and received double platinum certification from the Federation of the Italian Music Industry.

The first single taken from the album was "Credimi ancora". The song ranked 3rd in the 60th Sanremo Music Festival and debuted at number 3 on the Italian Singles Chart.

The other singles from the album were "Stanco (Deeper Inside)", released in May 2011, and the ballad "In un giorno qualunque", released on 1 October 2010.

Background 
In October 2010, Mengoni explained the reason why he decided to title his album Re matto (in English, "Crazy king"):

The album was recorded in early 2010, immediately after the release of the first album by Mengoni, "Dove si vola". It was produced by Stefano Calabrese, Stella Fabiani, Marco Mengoni and Gianluca Vaccaro for "Cantieri Musicali".

Composition and themes 
The album features songs with different musical styles: "Credimi ancora" is a symphonic rock song, while "Questa notte" and "In un giorno qualunque" are typical Italian-style pop ballads. Other tracks are influenced by dance music, such as "Fino a ieri", while the second single, "Stanco (Deeper Inside)" has been described by critics as a pop-house song. Moreover, the Italian critic Mario Luzzatto Fegiz wrote that in "Re matto" Mengoni sometimes calls to mind David Bowie and Lou Reed.

During an interview with the Italian radio programme "Deejay chiama Italia", Mengoni said that he chose to record an album with different types of songs in order to allow himself to follow different expressive styles in the future. During the same interview, he stated that the song "Questa Notte" was influenced by Paolo Nutini's music.

Release and promotion 

The digital version of the album was released on 17 February 2010, two days before the physical version. To promote the album, Mengoni participated in the 60th Sanremo Music Festival with the song "Credimi ancora". Moreover, Mengoni appeared in several Italian TV programmes, including "Domenica In", "Domenica 5" and "Porta a Porta".

From February 2010 to March 2010 Mengoni promoted his album through an in-store tour, while the "Re matto tour", the singer's first tour, officially started on 3 May 2010 in Milan and ended in September 2010 with a concert in the same town, at the PalaSharp arena during the "Festa dell'Unità". The "Re matto tour" consisted of 56 concerts throughout Italy.

Critical reception 

The album received mixed reviews. Jason Birchmeier gave the album a negative review, claiming that "there's little substance on this 24-minute EP and too much of the material is half-baked".

Guido Marco gave it 3.5 stars out of 5 and wrote on the Italian music magazine Musica e dischi that "the mix of vocal neurotic flashes on a pop rock musical texture, with an absolutely simple and incisive lexicon, makes of Mengoni something more than a promise".

Italian popular critic Mario Luzzatto Fegiz wrote on the newspaper Il Corriere della Sera that Mengoni is not always at the same level as in "Credimi Ancora", but he has charisma and a great gift in giving renditions of his song.

Commercial performance 
The album debuted at number 1 on the Italian Albums Chart, holding down the number one spot for four weeks. In April 2010 it was certified Platinum and in January 2011 the copies sold by Re matto were more than 82.000.

Track list

Charts and certifications

Year-end charts

Personnel 
 Marco Mengoni – vocals, backing vocals
 Fabio Gurian – strings
 Piero Calabrese – keyboards, computer programming
 Massimo Calabrese – bass
 Stefano Calabrese – electric guitar, acoustic guitar
 Alessandro Canini – drums
 Roberto Procaccini – piano, keyboards, computer programming
 Peter Cornacchia – electric guitar, acoustic guitar, classical guitar
 Marco Rinalduzzi – acoustic guitar, twelve-string guitar
 Davide Colomba – backing vocals
 Giovanni Pallotti – bass
 Chris Cags – radio speaker
 Andrea Secchi – intro radio editing concept

References 

2010 EPs
Sony Music Italy EPs
Italian-language EPs
Marco Mengoni EPs